The People Power Party held a leadership election on 11 June 2021.

The party leadership was vacant since 15 April 2020 following the resignation of Hwang Kyo-ahn on that day due to the party's crushing defeat in the 2020 election. Until the leadership election is held, there were 4 acting party presidents — Shim Jae-chul, Joo Ho-young, Kim Chong-in and Kim Gi-hyeon; all except Kim Chong-in were the parliamentary leaders. A new party president and vice presidents (including one representing youths) were elected in this election.

Lee Jun-seok, who was the most favourable candidate in this election, won party presidency. Jo Soo-jin, Bae Hyun-jin, Kim Jae-won and Jung Mi-kyung was also elected the Vice Presidents of the party. Kim Yong-tae was chosen the Vice President (representing youths).

Background 
On 15 January 2019, the former Prime Minister Hwang Kyo-ahn officially joined the Liberty Korea Party (LKP), and after 2 weeks, he announced his bid to run for the leadership election. On 27 February, Hwang was officially elected the President of the LKP, receiving overall 50.0%. He led the revival of the party in Yeongnam region at the 2019 by-elections, but its supports were far behind of the Democratic Party. As the general election was coming near, the LKP merged with the New Conservative Party (NCP) and the Onward for Future 4.0 to establish the United Future Party (UFP) on 17 February 2020.

2020 election and aftermath 
The UFP then ran for the general election along with its satellite partner, Future Korea Party (FKP). Nevertheless, the UFP-FKP alliance faced a disastrous defeat, with only securing 103 out of 300 seats. Hwang Kyo-ahn, who contested for Jongno, lost to the Democratic candidate Lee Nak-yon. Following the crushing defeat, Hwang made an announcement to resign as the party president. As the party presidency was vacant, the parliamentary leader Shim Jae-chul became the acting president.

However, as Shim also lost to Lee Jae-jung in his constituency, the party soon elected Joo Ho-young as the new parliamentary leader; he also automatically became the acting president on 8 May. On 22 May, the party agreed to establish the Emergency Response Committee, led by Kim Chong-in, where the term was set until the by-elections on 7 April 2021. On 28 May, the FKP was merged into the UFP, and was de-registered the next day.

Change the party name 
Under the leadership of Kim Chong-in, the party has decided to change its name to the People Power Party (Korean: 국민의힘, abb. PPP) on 31 August, as a part of the renovation. It has also requested the name change to the National Election Commission. The name change was officially confirmed on 2 September.

2021 by-elections and revival 

In the by-elections on 7 April 2021, the People Power Party (PPP) achieved an outright victory, where Oh Se-hoon and Park Heong-joon was elected the Mayor of Seoul and the Mayor of Busan respectively. As the term of Kim Chong-in ended, Joo Ho-young returned as the acting president. However, he announced his resignation on 16 April, and remained until replaced by Kim Gi-hyeon on 30 April.

Campaign

Announcement 
On 23 April 2021, Cho Hae-jin, the MP for Miryang-Uiryeong-Haman-Changnyeong, announced his candidacy for the leadership, which was the first within the party. He stated that in order to win the 2022 presidential election, the party needs a "leadership of tolerance and integration" to unite pan-opposition blocs. He also emphasised himself as a "Yeongnam-born having an image of Seoul Metropolitan Area-born".

On 10 May, Joo Ho-young, the MP for Suseong 1st, as well as the former interim President of the party, officially launched a bid for the leadership election. He mentioned that he would lead a pan-opposition unity to win the 2022 presidential election. He promised to make the party to practice freedom and justice, party to unite with centrists, party with a competent policy and authority, party that youths are participating, and an opened and communicating smart party.

On 14 May, Kim Eun-hye, the MP for Bundang 1st, announced her campaign to become the President of the People Power Party (PPP) that was vacant following the resignation of Hwang Kyo-ahn. She indicated that the party needs a "revolutionary change" to win the 2022 presidential election. She promised to adopt a youth quota system for the party.

On 21 May, a day before the nomination, Cho Hae-jin declared to run for vice presidency instead of presidency, stating that he was "not prepared to contest". He, however, indicated that he would keep fulfilling his promises as a vice president should he is elected.

Nomination and elimination 
On 28 May, 5 candidates were formally confirmed as the final candidates, they are: Cho Kyoung-tae, Hong Moon-pyo, Joo Ho-young, Lee Jun-seok and Na Kyung-won. Other 3 candidates — Kim Eun-hye, Kim Woong and Yoon Young-seok, were eliminated.

Candidates

Presidential candidates

Nominated

Eliminated 
On 28 May 2021, 3 candidates — Kim Eun-hye, Kim Woong and Yoon Young-seok, were eliminated.

Potential 
The following MPs were touted by the media as potential candidates for the leadership of the People Power Party but did not stand:
 Kim Moo-sung, former President of the Saenuri Party
 Yun Hee-suk, MP for Seocho 1st

Withdrawn 
The following MPs announced that they would seek the leadership of the People Power Party but subsequently did not stand, withdrew from the race, or stood for vice presidency, due to insufficient support or other reasons:
 Cho Hae-jin, MP for Miryang-Uiryeong-Haman-Changnyeong (2020-), former MP for Miryang-Changnyeong (2008-2016) — running for vice presidency
 Kim So-yeon, former Member of the Daejeon Metropolitan Council for West District 6th (2018-2020)
 Shin Sang-jin, former MP for Jungwon (2005-2012; 2015–2020)

Declined 
The following MPs were touted by the media as potential candidates for the leadership of the People Power Party but subsequently declined to stand:
 Chung Jin-suk, MP for Gongju-Buyeo-Cheongyang (2016-), former MP for Gongju-Yeongi (2000-2004; 2005-2008)
 Kwon Yeong-se, MP for Yongsan (2020-), former MP for Yeongdeungpo 2nd (2002-2012)

Vice presidential candidates

Nominated 
 Bae Hyun-jin, MP for Songpa 2nd (2020-)
 Cheon Kang-jung
 Cho Dae-won
 Cho Hae-jin, MP for Miryang-Uiryeong-Haman-Changnyeong (2020-), former MP for Miryang-Changnyeong (2008-2016)
 Do Tae-woo, lawyer, former pre-candidate for Daegu East District 2nd
 Jo Soo-jin, proportional MP (2020-)
 Jung Mi-kyung, former MP for Gwonseon/Suwon 2nd (2008-2012; 2014–2016)
 Kim Jae-won, former MP for Sangju-Gunwi-Uiseong-Cheongsong (2017-2020), former MP for Gunwi-Uiseong-Cheongsong (2004-2008; 2012–2016)
 Lee Young, proportional MP (2020-)
 Won Young-sup, former Saenuri candidate for Gwanak 1st in 2016

Potential 
 Heo Eun-a, proportional MP (2020-)
 Hwangbo Seung-hee, MP for Central-Yeongdo (2020-)

Vice presidential candidates (representing youths)

Nominated 
 Ham Seul-ong
 Hong Jong-ki, Deputy Spokesperson of the PPP, former candidate for Suwon 4th
 Kang Tae-rin
 Kim Yong-tae, former candidate for Gwangmyeong 2nd
 Lee Yong, proportional MP (2020-)

Endorsements

Lee Jun-seok 
 Oh Se-hoon, Mayor of Seoul (2006-2011; 2021-)
 Choung Byoung-gug, Former Minister of Culture, Sports and Tourism, Former MP for Yeoju - Yangpyeong Parliamentary Constituency(2000-2020)
 Yoo Seong-min, Former MP for Daegu Dong B Parliamentary Constituency(2004-2020)
 Oh Shin-hwan, Former MP for Seoul Gwanak B Parliamentary Constituency(2015-2020)
 Ha Tae-keung, MP for Busan Haeundae A Parliamentary Constituency (2012-)

Timeline

2020 
 15 April: Hwang Kyo-ahn announced his resignation as the party president. Shim Jae-chul became the acting president.
 8 May: Joo Ho-young was elected the new parliamentary leader, succeeding acting presidency from Shim Jae-chul.
 22 May: Emergency Response Committee led by Kim Chong-in established, which the term was until 8 April 2021.

2021 
 8 April: The term of Kim Chong-in ended. Joo Ho-young returned as the acting president.
 30 April: Kim Gi-hyeon was elected the new parliamentary leader, succeeding acting presidency from Joo Ho-young.
 11 May: The party decided to hold a leadership election on 11 June.
 22 May:
 09:00 – Nominations for candidates open.
 17:00 — Nominations close, and 8 presidential and 10 vice-presidential candidates were confirmed.
 26 May: Opinion pollings for pre-candidates start.
 27 May: Opinion pollings for pre-candidates are supposed to end and 3 to be eliminated on this day, but is postponed to the next day due to lack of samples.
 28 May: Opinion pollings for pre-candidates end. Kim Eun-hye, Kim Woong and Yoon Young-seok are eliminated.
 30 May: Campaigns will be held in Gwangju, South Jeolla, North Jeolla and Jeju.
 2 June: Campaigns will be held in Busan, Ulsan and South Gyeongsang.
 3 June: Campaigns will be held in Daegu and North Gyeongsang.
 4 June: Campaigns will be held in Daejeon, Sejong, North Chungcheong and South Chungcheong.
 6 June: Campaigns will be held in Seoul, Incheon, Gyeonggi and Gangwon.
 7 June: Electoral college ballots (mobile) begin.
 8 June: Electoral college ballots (mobile) close.
 9 June: Electoral college ballots (ARS) and non-member opinion polling begin.
 10 June: Electoral college ballots (ARS) and non-member opinion polling close.
 11 June: Result was announced; Lee Jun-seok was declared the new President of the party.

Opinion polling

Post-nomination

Pre-nomination

Results 
Turnout was 45.36%, the highest since 2011 (including the predecessor Grand National Party).

Lee Jun-seok received the highest votes in the opinion polling (58.76%) and was elected the new president with total 93,392 votes (43.81%). Na Kyung-won came behind of Lee with 79,161 votes (37.13%), although she received the highest votes among the electoral college, which is 61,077 votes (40.93%).

President

Vice Presidents

Vice President (representing youths)

See also 
 2019 Liberty Korea Party leadership election
 2021 Democratic Party of Korea leadership by-election

References 

People Power Party (South Korea)
Political party leadership elections in South Korea
2021 in South Korea
People Power Party leadership election